This is an incomplete list of painters in the collection of the Frans Hals Museum in Haarlem, Netherlands, with the number of artworks represented, and sorted by century of birth. For more information about the collection which comprises more than 760 works, see Frans Hals Museum. More than 100 works are by unknown or anonymous painters, and though over 200 individual artists are in the collection, many of these are represented by only one work, which is often a commemorative portrait of a Haarlem politician. The collection was founded by the Haarlem city council and the first gallery was in the city hall itself. The highlights of the collection are the oldest works such as former altarpieces from Haarlem churches, but also large works for other former Haarlem institutions by Frans Hals, Maarten van Heemskerck, and Jan de Bray. Most of the artists in the collection were born in the 16th and 17th centuries. Only four women are represented with works in the collection, namely Judith Leyster, Charley Toorop and the sisters Catharina Jacoba and Christina Gerardus Enschedé.

Born in the 15th century 

David, Gerard (Oudewater, 1460 – Bruges, 1523), 1 work
Heemskerck, Maarten van (Heemskerk, 1498 – Haarlem, 1574), 24 works
Master of Alkmaar (Alkmaar, 1475 – Alkmaar, 1515), 3 works
Memling, Hans (Seligenstadt, 1430 – Bruges, 1494), 1 work
Mostaert, Jan (Haarlem, 1465 – Haarlem, 1553), 1 work
Raphael (after) (Urbino, 1483 – Rome, 1520), 1 work
Scorel, Jan van (Schoorl, 1495 – Utrecht, 1562), 4 works

Born in the 16th century
Anthonisz., Aert (Antwerp, 1579 – Amsterdam, 1620), 2 works
Bloemaert, Abraham (Gorinchem, 1564 – Utrecht, 1651), 1 work
Bollongier, Hans (Haarlem, 1600 – Haarlem, 1673), 2 works
Bray, Salomon de (Amsterdam, 1597 – Haarlem, 1664), 1 work
Bruegel, Pieter (Breda, 1526 – Brussels, 1569), 1 work
Brueghel, Pieter (Brussels, 1564 – Antwerp, 1638), 1 work
Claesz., Pieter (Berchem, 1597 – Haarlem, 1660), 1 work
Codde, Pieter (Amsterdam, 1599 – Amsterdam, 1678), 4 works
Cornelisz. van Haarlem, Cornelis (Haarlem, 1562 – Haarlem, 1637), 19 works
Droochsloot, Joost Cornelisz. (Utrecht, 1630 – Utrecht, 1673), 1 work
Duyster, Willem Cornelisz. (Amsterdam, 1599 – Amsterdam, 1635), 1 work
Dyck, Floris van (Haarlem, 1575 – Haarlem, 1651), 1 work
Engelsz., Cornelis (Gouda, 1574 – Haarlem, 1650), 2 works
Geest, Wybrand de (Leeuwarden, 1592 – Leeuwarden, 1661), 4 works
Goltzius, Hendrick (Venlo, 1558 – Haarlem, 1617), 5 works
Goyen, Jan Josefsz. van (Leiden, 1596 – The Hague, 1656), 3 works
Grebber, Frans Pietersz. de (Haarlem, 1573 – Haarlem, 1649), 9 works
Hals, Dirck (Haarlem, 1591 – Haarlem, 1656), 4 works
Hals, Frans (Antwerp, 1582 – Haarlem, 1666), 15 works
Heda, Willem Claesz. (Haarlem, 1594 – Haarlem, 1680), 2 works
Honthorst, Gerard van (Utrecht, 1592 – Utrecht, 1656), 2 works
Kemp, Nicolaes de (Haarlem, 1574 – Haarlem, 1647), 1 work
Keyser, Thomas de (Amsterdam, 1596 – Amsterdam, 1667), 1 work
Laer, Pieter van (Haarlem, 1592 – Haarlem, 1642), 1 work
Mander, Karel van (Meulebeke, 1548 – Amsterdam, 1606), 3 works
Mandijn, Jan (Haarlem, 1500 – Antwerp, 1560), 1 work
Matham, Jacob (Haarlem, 1571 – Haarlem, 1631), 1 work
Mierevelt, Michiel Jansz. van (Delft, 1567 – Delft, 1641), 13 works
Molijn, Pieter de (London, 1595 – Haarlem, 1661), 1 work
Molijn, Pieter de (London, 1595 – Haarlem, 1661), 2 works
Nieulandt, Adriaen van (Antwerp, 1587 – Amsterdam, 1658), 1 work
Pietersz., Pieter (Antwerp, 1540 – Amsterdam, 1603), 3 works
Pot, Hendrik Cornelisz (Amsterdam, 1585 – Amsterdam, 1657), 8 works
Pynas, Jacob Symonsz. (Haarlem, 1592 – Delft, 1650), 1 work
Ravesteyn, Jan Antonisz. van (The Hague, 1572 – The Hague, 1657), 5 works
Rijck, Pieter Cornelisz. van (Delft, 1567 – Italy, 1637), 1 work
Rubens, Peter Paul (Antwerp, 1577 – Antwerp, 1640), 1 work
Saenredam, Pieter Jansz. (Assendelft, 1597 – Haarlem, 1665), 3 works
Savery, Hans (Kortrijk, 1564 – Haarlem, 1623), 1 work
Savery, Roelant (Kortrijk, 1576 – Utrecht, 1639), 1 work
Schooten, Floris van (Haarlem, 1588 – Haarlem, 1656), 2 works
Seghers, Hercules (Haarlem, 1589 – The Hague, 1638), 1 work
Soutman, Pieter Claesz. (Haarlem, 1580 – Haarlem, 1657), 5 works
Sweelink, Gerrit Pietersz. (Amsterdam, 1566 – Amsterdam, 1612), 1 work
Velde, Esaias van de (Amsterdam, 1587 – The Hague, 1630), 3 works
Venne, Adriaen Pietersz. van de (Delft, 1589 – The Hague, 1662), 1 work
Verbeeck, Cornelis (Haarlem, 1590 – Haarlem, 1647), 1 work
Vermeyen, Jan Cornelisz. (Beverwijk, 1500 – Brussels, 1559), 2 works
Verspronck, Johannes Cornelisz. (Haarlem, 1600 – Haarlem, 1662), 13 works
Vries, Abraham de (Rotterdam, 1590 – The Hague, 1655), 1 work
Vroom, Hendrik Cornelisz. (Haarlem, 1563 – Haarlem, 1640), 3 works
Wieringen, Cornelis Claesz. van (Haarlem, 1580 – Haarlem, 1633), 2 works
Willaerts, Adam (London, 1577 – Utrecht, 1664), 1 work
Witte, Peter de (Bruges, 1548 – Munich, 1628), 1 work

Born in the 17th century
Anraedt, Pieter van (Utrecht, 1635 – Deventer, 1678), 1 work
Backer, Adriaen (Amsterdam, 1609 – Amsterdam, 1685), 1 work
Baen, Jan de (Haarlem, 1633 – The Hague, 1702), 1 work
Beelt, Cornelis (Rotterdam, 1607 – Haarlem or Rotterdam, 1664), 3 works
Beerstraaten, Jan Abrahamsz. (Amsterdam, 1622 – Amsterdam, 1666), 2 works
Bega, Cornelis Pietersz. (Haarlem, 1620 – Haarlem, 1664), 1 work
Berchem, Nicolaes Pietersz. (Haarlem, 1620 – Amsterdam, 1683), 2 works
Berckheyde, Gerrit Adriaensz. (Haarlem, 1638 – Haarlem, 1698), 5 works
Berckheyde, Job Adriaensz. (Haarlem, 1630 – Haarlem, 1692), 3 works
Bleeck, Richard van (The Hague, 1670 – London, 1733), 4 works
Bleker, Gerrit Claesz. (Haarlem, 1592 – Haarlem, 1656), 1 work
Bodecker, George (1658 – 1727), 2 works
Boonen, Arnold (Dordrecht, 1669 – Amsterdam, 1729), 7 works
Borch, Gerard ter (Zwolle, 1617 – Deventer, 1681), 2 works
Brakenburgh, Richard (Haarlem, 1650 – Haarlem, 1702), 1 work
Brandon, Jan Hendrik (1660 – 1714), 2 works
Bray, Jan de (Haarlem, 1627 – Haarlem, 1697), 13 works
Brekelenkam, Quiringh Gerritsz. van (Zwammerdam, 1622 – Leiden, 1670), 2 works
Brouwer, Adriaen (Oudenaarde, 1605 – Antwerp, 1638), 1 work
Cooghen, Leendert van der (Haarlem, 1632 – Haarlem, 1681), 1 work
Court, Johannes Franciscus de la (Brussels, 1684 – Leiden, 1753), 4 works
Court, Martinus de la (Leiden, 1640 – Brussels, 1710), 5 works
Craesbeeck, Joos van (Linter, 1605 – Brussels, 1659), 1 work
Croos, Anthonie Jansz. van der (Alkmaar, 1606 – The Hague, 1662), 1 work
Cuyp, Aelbert (Dordrecht, 1620 – Dordrecht, 1691), 1 work
Decker, Frans (1684 – 1751), 8 works
Dusart, Cornelis (Haarlem, 1660 – Haarlem, 1704), 2 works
Ehinger, Emanuel (active 1687 – 1699), 2 works
Everdingen, Allaert van (Alkmaar, 1621 – Amsterdam, 1675), 1 work
Everdingen, Cesar Boetius van (Alkmaar, 1617 – Alkmaar, 1678), 2 works
Grebber, Pieter Fransz. de (Haarlem, 1600 – Haarlem, 1653), 5 works
Haensbergen, Jan van (Gorinchem, 1642 – The Hague, 1705), 1 work
Hals, Frans (Haarlem, 1618 – Haarlem, 1669), 1 work
Hals, Harmen (Haarlem, 1611 – Haarlem, 1669), 2 works
Hals, Reynier (Haarlem, 1627 – Haarlem, 1671), 3 works
Haringh, Daniël (The Hague, 1636 – The Hague, 1713), 14 works
Haye, Reinier de la (The Hague, 1640 – The Hague, 1700), 1 work
Heemskerck, Egbert (Haarlem, 1634 – London, 1704), 2 works
Heeremans, Thomas (Haarlem, 1641 – Haarlem, 1694), 1 work
Heerschop, Hendrick (Haarlem, 1626 – Haarlem, 1690), 1 work
Hees, Gerrit van (1629 – 1702), 1 work
Helst, Bartholomeus van der (Haarlem, 1613 – Amsterdam, 1670), 1 work
Holsteyn, Cornelis (Haarlem, 1618 – Amsterdam, 1658), 2 works
Hulsman, Johann (Cologne, 1580 – 1643), 1 work
Hulst, Frans de (Haarlem, 1606 – Haarlem, 1661), 1 work
Jongh, Ludolf de (Overschie, 1616 – Rotterdam, 1679), 1 work
Knijff, Willem (Haarlem, 1646 – Haarlem, 1670), 2 works
Knüpfer, Nicolaes (Leipzig, 1609 – Utrecht, 1655), 1 work
Lagoor, Johan de (Haarlem, 1620 – Haarlem, 1660), 1 work
Leyster, Judith (Haarlem, 1609 – Heemstede, 1660), 2 works
Lingelbach, Johannes (Frankfurt am Main, 1622 – Amsterdam, 1674), 1 work
Loo, Jacob van (Sluis, 1614 – Paris, 1670), 5 works
Looten, Jan (Amsterdam, 1618 – England, 1683), 1 work
Maas, Dirk (Haarlem, 1659 – Haarlem, 1717), 1 work
Maes, Nicolaes (Dordrecht, 1634 – Amsterdam, 1693), 6 works
Marrel, Jacob (Frankenthal, 1613 – Frankfurt-am-Main, 1681), 1 work
Mieris, Frans van (Leiden, 1689 – Leiden, 1763), 1 work
Mijtens, Johannes (The Hague, 1614 – The Hague, 1670), 2 works
Molenaer, Jan Miense (Haarlem, 1610 – Haarlem, 1688), 3 works
Momper, Frans de (Antwerp, 1603 – Antwerp, 1660), 1 work
Naiveu, Matthijs (Leiden, 1647 – Amsterdam, 1721), 1 work
Nason, Pieter (1612 – 1690), 2 works
Netscher, Caspar (Heidelberg, 1639 – The Hague, 1684), 1 work
Netscher, Constantijn (The Hague, 1668 – The Hague, 1723), 1 work
Netscher, Theodorus (Bordeaux, 1661 – The Hague, 1728), 2 works
Ostade, Adriaen van (Haarlem, 1610 – Haarlem, 1685), 2 works
Ostade, Isaac van (Haarlem, 1621 – Haarlem, 1649), 5 works
Oudendijck, Adriaen (Haarlem, 1677 – Haarlem, 1704), 1 work
Ovens, Jürgen (Tonning, 1623 – Friedrichstadt, 1678), 1 work
Post, Frans Jansz. (Leiden, 1612 – Haarlem, 1680), 1 work
Post, Pieter Jansz. (Haarlem, 1608 – The Hague, 1669), 1 work
Pronck, Hendrick (died in Amsterdam, 1693), 1 work
Querfurt, Tobias (1660 – Wolfenbüttel, 1734), 1 work
Quinkhard, Jan Maurits (Rees, 1688 – Amsterdam, 1772), 3 works
Ragueneau, Abraham (London, 1623 – London, 1690), 3 works
Roestraeten, Pieter Gerritsz. van (Haarlem, 1630 – London, 1700), 1 work
Rombouts, Gillis (Haarlem, 1630 – Haarlem, 1672), 1 work
Rombouts, Salomon (Haarlem, 1655 – Italy, 1695), 1 work
Roosendael, Nicolaas (Hoorn, 1634 – Amsterdam, 1686), 1 work
Ruisdael, Jacob Isaacksz. van (Haarlem, 1628 – Haarlem, 1682), 4 works
Ruysdael, Salomon van (Naarden, 1602 – Haarlem, 1670), 3 works
Rijckhals, Frans (Middelburg, 1600 – Middelburg, 1647), 1 work
Santvoort, Dirck Dircksz. van (Amsterdam, 1610 – Amsterdam, 1680), 2 works
Santvoort, Pieter Dircksz. van (Amsterdam, 1604 – Amsterdam, 1635), 1 work
Steen, Jan Havicksz. (Leiden, 1626 – Leiden, 1679), 1 work
Storck, Abraham (Amsterdam, 1644 – Amsterdam, 1708), 2 works
Sweerts, Michael (Brussels, 1618 – Goa, 1664), 1 work
Toorenvliet, Jacob (Leiden, 1640 – Leiden, 1719), 1 work
Troost, Cornelis (Amsterdam, 1697 – Amsterdam, 1750), 1 work
Troyen, Rombout van (Amsterdam, 1605 – Amsterdam, 1655), 1 work
Ulft, Jacob van der (Gorinchem, 1627 – Noordwijk, 1690), 1 work
Velde, Jan van de (Haarlem, 1620 – Enkhuizen, 1662), 1 work
Verkolje, Jan (Amsterdam, 1650 – Delft, 1693), 5 works
Verkolje, Nicolaas (Delft, 1673 – Amsterdam, 1746), 3 works
Vermeer van Haarlem, Jan (Haarlem, 1628 – Haarlem, 1691), 3 works
Verwilt, François (Rotterdam, 1623 – Rotterdam, 1691), 1 work
Victors, Jan (Amsterdam, 1619 – Indonesia, 1676), 1 work
Vinne, Jan Vincentsz. van der (Haarlem, 1663 – Haarlem, 1721), 1 work
Vinne, Vincent Laurensz. van der (Haarlem, 1628 – Haarlem, 1702), 5 works
Vinne, Laurens Vincentsz. van der (Haarlem, 1658 – Haarlem, 1729), 2 works
Weenix, Jan Baptist (Amsterdam, 1621 – Utrecht, 1661), 4 works
Wet, Jacob de (Haarlem, 1610 – Haarlem, 1675), 3 works
Wet (II), Jacob de (Haarlem, 1641 – Haarlem, 1697), 1 work
Wijck, Thomas (Beverwijk, 1616 – Haarlem, 1677), 2 works
Wijnants, Jan (Haarlem, 1632 – Amsterdam, 1684), 1 work
Willaerts, Abraham (Utrecht, 1603 – Utrecht, 1669), 1 work
Wils, Jan (Amsterdam, 1603 – Haarlem, 1666), 1 work
Wilt, Thomas van der (Korendijk, 1659 – Delft, 1733), 2 works
Wolfaerts, Jan Baptist (Antwerp, 1625 – Antwerp, 1687), 1 work
Wouwerman, Jan (Haarlem, 1629 – Haarlem, 1666), 1 work
Wouwerman, Philips (Haarlem, 1619 – Haarlem, 1668), 5 works
Zijl, Roeloff (c1600 – Utrecht, 1630), 1 work

Born in the 18th century
Augustini, Jacobus Luberti (Haarlem, 1748 – Haarlem, 1822), 2 works
Barbiers (III), Pieter (1772 – 1837), 5 works
Bolomey, Benjamin Samuel (1739 – 1819), 3 works
Buttner, Jurriaan (died in Amsterdam, 1767), 2 works
Cels, Cornelis (Lier, Belgium, 1778 – Brussels, 1859), 3 works
Claterbos, Augustijn (1750 – 1828), 1 work
Croix, Pierre Frédéric de la (1709 – 1782), 3 works
Dubois-Drahonet, Alexandre Jean (Paris, 1791 – Paris, 1834), 2 works
Enschedé, Christina Gerardus (Haarlem, 1791 – Haarlem, 1873), 1 work
Farret, Coenraad (1710 – 1730), 1 work
Fournier, Jean (1703 – 1754), 4 works
Garnier, Narcisse (Paris, 1770 – Paris, 1833), 2 works
Hendriks, Wybrand (Amsterdam, 1744 – Haarlem, 1831), 17 works
Hodges, Charles Howard (1764 – 1837), 6 works
Hoorn, Jordanus (1753 – 1833), 1 work
Horstink, Warnaar (Haarlem, 1756 – Haarlem, 1815), 3 works
Horstok, Johannes Petrus van (Haarlem, 1745 – Haarlem, 1825), 4 works
Jelgersma, Tako Hajo (Harlingen, 1702 – Haarlem, 1795), 3 works
Kaldenbach, Arnold (died in Zutphen, 1799), 1 work
Lelie, Adriaan de (Tilburg, 1755 – Amsterdam, 1820), 1 work
Mol, Woutherus (1785 – 1857), 2 works
Oorloft, Joseph Philippe (Brussels, 1792 – Brussels, 1861), 1 work
Ouwater, Isaac (Amsterdam, 1748 – Amsterdam, 1793), 4 works
Palthe, Jan (Deventer, 1717 – Leiden, 1769), 1 work
Poort, Aldert Jacob van der (Dokkum, 1771 – Leeuwarden, 1807), 2 works
Prins, Johannes Huibert (The Hague, 1757 – Utrecht, 1806), 1 work
Puyl, Louis François Gerard van der (1750 – 1824), 1 work
Reekers, Johannes (1790 – 1858), 1 work
Reysen, Josef van (1768 – 1829), 1 work
Schmidt, Izaäk (Amsterdam, 1740 – 1818), 2 works
Temminck, Leonard (1753 – 1813), 2 works
Hulst, Jan Baptist van der (Leuven, 1790 – Brussels, 1862), 2 works
Vinne, Vincent Jansz. van der (Haarlem, 1736 – Haarlem, 1811), 4 works
Zijderveld, Willem (Amsterdam, 1793 – Amsterdam, 1846), 1 work

Born in the 19th century
Beijer, Jan Lodewijk (Amsterdam, 1818 – Amsterdam, 1858), 1 work
Bosboom, Johannes (The Hague, 1817 – The Hague, 1891), 1 work
Cate, Hendrik Jan ten (Amsterdam, 1867 – Amsterdam, 1955), 1 work
Craeyvanger, Reinier (Utrecht, 1812 – 1880), 2 works
Dijsselhof, Gerrit Willem (1866 – Overveen, 1924), 1 work
Egenberger, Johannes Hinderikus (Arnhem, 1822 – Utrecht, 1897), 1 work
Ehnle, Adrianus Johannes (1819 – 1863), 1 work
Enschedé, Catharina Jacoba (Haarlem, 1828 – Bloemendaal, 1883), 1 work
Eymer, Arnoldus Johannes (1803 – 1863), 1 work
Gestel, Leo (Woerden, 1881 – Hilversum, 1941), 5 works
Gratama, Gerrit David (Groningen, 1874 – Haarlem, 1965), 2 works
Israëls, Isaac (Amsterdam, 1865 – The Hague, 1934), 4 works
Klinkenberg, Johannes Christiaan Karel (The Hague, 1852 – The Hague, 1924), 1 work
Kruseman, Jan Adam (Haarlem, 1804 – Haarlem, 1862), 17 works
Kruyder, Herman (Baarn, 1881 – Amsterdam, 1935), 12 works
Looy, Jac. van (Haarlem, 1855 – Haarlem, 1930), 12 works
Poorter, Bastiaan de (Haarlem, 1813 – 1880), 1 work
Slager, Piet (Amsterdam, 1841 – 1912), 1 work
Sluijters, Jan (Amsterdam, 1881 – 1957), 8 works
Spoor, Cornelis (1867 – 1928), 1 work
Springer, Cornelis (Amsterdam, 1817 – Hilversum, 1891), 2 works
Stadt, C. van der (1860 – Haarlem, 1883), 1 work
Thorn Prikker, Johan (The Hague, 1868 – Cologne, 1932), 1 work
Toorop, Charley (Katwijk, 1891 – Bergen, 1955), 1 work
Toorop, Jan (Katwijk, 1858 – Bergen, 1928), 2 works
Verschuur, Wouter (Amsterdam, 1812 – Vorden, 1874), 2 works
Weyand, Jacob Gerrit (Amsterdam, 1886 – Bakkum, 1960), 1 work
Wijnveld, Barend (1820 – 1902), 1 work

Born in the 20th century
Kat, Otto B. De (Dordrecht, 1907 – Laren, 1995), 45 works
Postma, Hannes (Haarlem, 1933 – 0), 1 work
Verwey, Kees (Amsterdam, 1900 – Haarlem, 1995), 1 work
Wezelaar, Han (Haarlem, 1901 – Amsterdam, 1984), 1 work

References
 Netherlands Institute for Art History
 Painting in Haarlem, 1500-1850: the collection of the Frans Hals Museum, by Neeltje Köhler, Koos Levy-van Halm, Epco Runia and Pieter van Thiel, Ludion, Amsterdam, 2006 

Frans Hals Museum
Lists of painters
Frans Hals museum
Netherlands-related lists